William Deming (March 16, 1833 – September 21, 1891) was an American politician and physician.

Deming, son of William and Charlotte Tryon Deming, was born March 16, 1833, at Litchfield, Connecticut. After graduation from Yale Medical School in 1856, he practiced medicine for nine years at Lenox, Massachusetts. Following a brief residence at Morris, Connecticut, he returned in 1867 to Litchfield, where, except during one year at Hartford, he labored in his profession up to a few weeks before his death, on September 21, 1891.

During his twenty-three years of professional life at Litchfield,  Dr. Deming was very active in local enterprises. He was one of the early promoters and for many years a director and secretary of the Shepaug Railroad Company, held many offices of trust in the town, and in 1881-2 was President of the Connecticut Medical Society, serving also as President of the Litchfield County Medical Association.  He sat three times in the Connecticut House of Representatives, representing Morris in 1868 and Litchfield in 1875 and 1876, and was the Democratic candidate for Connecticut State Senator from his district in 1870.

Dr. Deming married, on December 18, 1858, Mary Benton, daughter of Horatio Benton, of Morris. His widow and three children —one son and two daughters—survived him.

1833 births
1891 deaths
Politicians from Litchfield, Connecticut
Yale School of Medicine alumni
Physicians from Connecticut
Members of the Connecticut House of Representatives
American railroad executives
19th-century American politicians
People from Lenox, Massachusetts
19th-century American businesspeople